{{Infobox film
| name           = See How They Run
| image          = "See_How_They_Run"_(1955).jpg
| caption        = British trade ad
| director       = Leslie Arliss
| producer       = Bill LuckwellDerek Winn
| writer         = Leslie ArlissRoy MillerVal Valentine
| based_on       = the play See How They Run by Philip King
| starring       = Ronald ShinerGreta GyntJames Haytor| cinematography = Kenneth Talbot
| music          = John Bath
| editing        = Sam Simmonds
| studio         = Winwell
| distributor    = British Lion Films (UK)
| released       = June 1955 (U.K.)
| runtime        = 84 minutes
| country        = United Kingdom
| language       = English
| gross          = £123,586 (UK)
}}See How They Run'' is a 1955 British comedy film directed by Leslie Arliss, and written by Leslie Arliss, Philip King, Roy Miller and Val Valentine. Produced by Bill Luckwell and Derek Winn for Winwell, the film stars Ronald Shiner as Wally Winton, Greta Gynt, James Hayter and Wilfrid Hyde-White.

Plot
In this crazy farce, Cockney corporal Wally Winton (Ronald Shiner) desires promotion so that he can finally receive an inheritance. He dresses up as a priest and goes out one night with Penelope Toop (Greta Gynt), the vicar's attractive blonde wife. To add to the theme of mistaken identity, there are several priests running around, some real, some fake. One of these, Basher (Charles Farrell), is discovered by Winton to be an escaped convict, and is placed under arrest. The corporal is then promoted and becomes eligible for his inheritance.

Cast
 Ronald Shiner as Wally Winton
 Greta Gynt as Penelope Toop
 James Hayter as Bishop of Lax
 Wilfrid Hyde-White as Brigadier Buskin
 Dora Bryan as Ida
 Richard Wattis as Reverend Lionel Toop
 Viola Lyel as Miss Skilton
 Charles Farrell as Basher
 Michael Brennan as Sergeant Major Towers
 Roddy Hughes as Reverend Arthur Humphrey
 Ballard Berkeley as Colonel Warrington

References

External links 

1955 films
1955 comedy films
Films directed by Leslie Arliss
British comedy films
1950s English-language films
1950s British films
British black-and-white films